Mónica Vargas Celis is a Mexican film and television producer. She has produced more than ten feature films, including American Curious, Como novio de pueblo, How to Break Up with Your Douchebag, and Amor a Primera Visa. She is also a producer of Club de Cuervos, the first Netflix original series in Spanish. Vargas is currently general director of production at Traziende Films, a company she founded with Leonardo Zimbrón in 2000.

Career
Mónica Vargas is a graduate of the Universidad Anáhuac México. She has worked with companies such as Netflix, Warner Bros., Televisa, and 20th Century Fox, and with actors such as Marina de Tavira, Luis Gerardo Méndez, Laura Ramsey, Mariana Treviño, Osvaldo Benavides, Jaime Camil, Jesús Zavala, Irán Castillo, Stockard Channing, Demián Bichir, Sandra Echeverría, and Diego Luna.

She has produced several feature films, including Efectos secundarios (2005), Amor a primera vista (2013), Un caballo llamado elefante (2013), Cómplices (2016), American Curious (2017), Todo mal (2017), Más sabe el diablo por viejo (2017) – a co-production with 20th Century Fox – and How to Break Up with Your Douchebag (2017). The latter became the 12th highest grossing film in the history of Mexico and was distributed in the United States, Peru, and Bolivia. Como novio de pueblo and Mentada de Padre were both released in 2019.

Television and streaming
In partnership with Alazraki Entertainment, Vargas launched the first Netflix original series in Spanish, Club de Cuervos. Its fourth season premiered on January 25, 2019. She also produced the Blim original series Dogma in 2017.

Awards and nominations
 Dogma, nominated for Best Series at the Premios TVyNovelas, 2018
 Netas divinas, nominated for Best Pay-TV Program at the Premios TVyNovelas, 2019

Filmography

Series

Films

References

External links
 
 
 Traziende Films

Living people
Mexican television producers
Mexican women film producers
Place of birth missing (living people)
Universidad Anáhuac México alumni
Year of birth missing (living people)